August Hansen (also Augustin Hansen; 23 April 1895 in  Kaansoo – 12 March 1952) was an Estonian politician. He was a member of I Riigikogu.

References

1895 births
1952 deaths
People from Põhja-Pärnumaa Parish
People from Kreis Fellin
Estonian Socialist Revolutionary Party politicians
Estonian Independent Socialist Workers' Party politicians
Communist Party of Estonia politicians
Members of the Riigikogu, 1920–1923
Members of the Supreme Soviet of the Estonian Soviet Socialist Republic, 1947–1951
Estonian people executed by the Soviet Union